"Roll Over Beethoven" is a 1956 hit song written by Chuck Berry, originally released on Chess Records single, with "Drifting Heart" as the B-side. The lyrics of the song mention rock and roll and the desire for rhythm and blues to be as respected as  classical music. The title of the song is an imperative directed at the composer Ludwig van Beethoven to roll over out of the way and make room for the rock and roll music that Berry was promoting. The song has been covered by many other artists, including the Beatles and the Electric Light Orchestra. Rolling Stone magazine ranked it number 97 on its list of the "500 Greatest Songs of All Time".

Inspiration and lyrics
According to Rolling Stone and Cub Koda of AllMusic, Berry wrote the song in response to his sister Lucy always using the family piano to play classical music when Berry wanted to play popular music. It was, as biographer Bruce Pegg says, "inspired in part by the rivalry between his sister Lucy's classical music training and Berry's own self-taught, rough-and-ready music preference". The lyric "roll over Beethoven and tell Tchaikovsky the news" refers to how classical composers would roll over in their graves upon hearing that classical music had given way to rock and roll.

In addition to the classical composers Ludwig van Beethoven and Pyotr Ilyich Tchaikovsky, the lyrics mention or allude to several popular artists: "Early in the Mornin'" is the title of a Louis Jordan song; "Blue Suede Shoes" refers to the Carl Perkins song; and "hey diddle diddle", from the nursery rhyme "The Cat and the Fiddle", is an indirect reference to the Chess recording artist Bo Diddley, who was an accomplished violin player. Although the lyrics mention "rocking" and "rolling", the music that the classics are supposed to step aside for is referred to as "rhythm and blues". The lyric "a shot of rhythm and blues" was appropriated as the title of a song recorded by Arthur Alexander and others.

Recording
The song was recorded at Universal Recording Corporation in Chicago, Illinois on April 19, 1956.
 Chuck Berry, vocals and guitar
 Johnnie Johnson on piano
 Willie Dixon on bass
 Melvin Billups on drums
The session was produced by the Chess brothers, Leonard and Phil.  The song was released as Chess single 1626.

Release
Berry's version was originally released as a single by Chess Records in May 1956, with "Drifting Heart" as the B-side.
It peaked at number two on the Billboard R&B chart and number 29 on the pop chart. "Roll Over Beethoven" and three other Berry songs were included on the album Rock, Rock, Rock, promoted as the soundtrack of the film of the same name, but only four of the 12 songs on the album were used in the film.

"Roll Over Beethoven" has been released numerous times on compilation albums, including Chuck Berry Twist and The Chess Box.

Legacy
Berry's single was one of 50 recordings chosen in 2003 by the Library of Congress to be added to the National Recording Registry. In 2004, "Roll Over Beethoven" was ranked number 97 on Rolling Stones list of "The 500 Greatest Songs of All Time". The accompanying review stated that it "became the ultimate rock & roll call to arms, declaring a new era".

Koda calls it a "masterpiece" that helped to define rock and roll.

Cover versions
"Roll Over Beethoven" is one of the most widely covered songs in popular music – "a staple of rock and roll bands", according to Koda – with notable versions by Jerry Lee Lewis and Linda Gail Lewis(#12Can), the Beatles, Carl Perkins, and Electric Light Orchestra.

The Beatles

"Roll Over Beethoven" was a favourite of John Lennon, Paul McCartney, and George Harrison even before they chose "the Beatles" as their name, and they continued to perform it right into their American tours of 1964. Their version of "Roll Over Beethoven" was recorded on July 30, 1963, for their second British LP, With the Beatles, and features Harrison on vocals and guitar. In the United States, it was released April 10, 1964, as the opening track of The Beatles' Second Album, and on May 11, 1964, as the opening track of the second Capitol EP, Four by the Beatles. It was released by Capitol in Canada with "Please Mister Postman" as the B-side, reaching number 2 on the CHUM Charts. This release reached number 68 on the U.S. Billboard Hot 100 and number 30 on the Cash Box Singles chart. In Sweden, it peaked at number 11 on the Kvällstoppen Chart. In Australia, it peaked at number one,
with Hold Me Tight as the B-side, as did it in Denmark.

In 1994, the Beatles released a live version of "Roll Over Beethoven" on Live at the BBC. This version had been recorded on February 28, 1964, and broadcast on March 30, 1964, as part of a BBC series starring the Beatles called From Us to You. This version of "Roll Over Beethoven" was used in the film Superman III, directed by Richard Lester, who also directed the Beatles' first two films, A Hard Day's Night and Help!. The following year, a live version from an October 1963 performance at the Karlaplansstudion in Stockholm was released on Anthology 1.

Personnel
 George Harrison – double-tracked vocals, lead guitar, handclaps
 John Lennon – rhythm guitar, handclaps
 Paul McCartney – bass, handclaps
 Ringo Starr – drums, handclaps

Electric Light Orchestra

Electric Light Orchestra's (ELO) elaborate eight-minute reworking of "Roll Over Beethoven", on the album ELO 2 in 1973, included an opening musical quote from Beethoven's Fifth Symphony and interpolations of material from the symphony's first movement into Berry's song and Peter Gunn theme in the background. This became one of ELO's signature songs and has been used to close the majority of their concerts. "Roll Over Beethoven" was the second single released by the band, in January 1973, and became their second consecutive top ten hit in the UK. An edited version of the track from ELO 2 was a #42 hit in the United States.

Chicago radio superstation WLS, which gave the song much airplay, ranked "Roll Over Beethoven" as the 89th most popular hit of 1973.
It reached as high as number 8 (for two weeks) on their surveys of September 1 and 8, 1973. The song reached number six on the competing station WCFL.

Chart performance

Weekly charts

Year-end charts

Narvel Felts
Narvel Felts covered the song in 1982. His version went to number 64 on the Hot Country Singles chart in 1982.

The Velaires
In 1961, the Flairs (not to be confused with the doo-wop group of the same name) recorded a version unsuccessfully. Later that year, they changed their name to the Velaires and signed with Jamie Records, and released it again. It quickly reached number one in Los Angeles. They had also been given the opportunity to perform it on the television program American Bandstand.

References

External links
 In-depth Song Analysis of ELO recording at the Jeff Lynne Song Database (Jefflynnesongs.com)
 
 
 

1956 singles
1956 songs
1964 singles
1973 singles
Capitol Records singles
Chess Records singles
Chuck Berry songs
Cultural depictions of Ludwig van Beethoven
Cultural depictions of Pyotr Ilyich Tchaikovsky
Songs about classical music
Songs about Ludwig van Beethoven
Electric Light Orchestra songs
Grammy Hall of Fame Award recipients
Harvest Records singles
Iron Maiden songs
Song recordings produced by George Martin
Song recordings produced by Jeff Lynne
United States National Recording Registry recordings
Narvel Felts songs
Songs written by Chuck Berry
The Beatles songs